Tres Caballeros (Spanish for "Three gentlemen") is the third studio album by The Aristocrats, released on June 23, 2015. The album was recorded in February 2015 during a period of ten days at the Sunset Sound Recorders studio in California. Alongside a standard CD edition, a deluxe edition is available, with a bonus DVD including studio and live footage, demos and alternate takes.

Track listing

Personnel
Guthrie Govan – guitar
Bryan Beller – bass
Marco Minnemann – drums

References

2015 albums
The Aristocrats (band) albums